The 2011 Manta Open was a professional tennis tournament played on hard courts. It was the eighth edition of the tournament which was part of the 2011 ATP Challenger Tour. It took place in Manta, Ecuador between 18 and 24 July 2011.

Singles main-draw entrants

Seeds

 1 Rankings are as of July 11, 2011.

Other entrants
The following players received wildcards into the singles main draw:
  Galo Barrezueta
  Joseph Correa
  Diego Hidalgo
  Roberto Quiroz

The following players received entry from the qualifying draw:
  Nicolás Barrientos
  Iván Endara
  Emilio Gómez
  Juan Sebastián Gómez

Champions

Singles

 Brian Dabul def.  Facundo Argüello, 6–1, 6–3

Doubles

 Brian Dabul /  Izak van der Merwe def.  John Paul Fruttero /  Raven Klaasen, 6–1, 6–7(7–2), [11–9]

External links
Official website
ITF Search 
ATP official site

Manta Open
Manta Open